Buffalo is an unincorporated community and census-designated place (CDP) in southern LaRue County, Kentucky, United States. Its population was 498 as of the 2010 census. It lies along Kentucky Route 61 south of the city of Hodgenville, the county seat of LaRue County.  Its elevation is 748 feet (228 m), and it is located at  (37.5120048, -85.6985728).  Although Buffalo is unincorporated, it has a post office, with the ZIP code of 42716.

Demographics

References

Census-designated places in Kentucky
Census-designated places in LaRue County, Kentucky
Unincorporated communities in Kentucky
Unincorporated communities in LaRue County, Kentucky